Finlaysons is an Australian commercial law firm with offices in Adelaide and Darwin. The firm began in 1851, under the name Ayers & Ayers. The name Finlayson has been part of the firm since 1918. It became Finlayson & Co in 1959, and was simplified to Finlaysons in 1981. In October 2013, the firm had around 155 employees, including 25 partners, 17 senior associates and four special counsel.

Affiliations
The firm is both a corporate member and event sponsor of the Committee for Economic Development of Australia, the Australian Institute of Company Directors and Family Business Australia. The firm is also a sponsor of the Australasian Land and Groundwater Association and Special Counsel Kyra Reznikov sits on its Adelaide branch committee. As of 2016, Finlaysons is a gold sponsor of the South Australian Chamber of Mines and Energy (SACOME).

Memberships
Reznikov is also a member of the South Australian Chamber of Mines and Energy's Women in Resources South Australia committee, and Finlaysons Partner George McKenzie is also a Councillor of SACOME. He is also a member of the Minerals and Energy Advisory Council which advises the  Government of South Australia directly. He was also a member of its predecessor, the Resources Industry Development Board prior to 2015. McKenzie is also a member of the Australian Geothermal Energy Association's Regulatory Sub-committee.

Finlaysons has also been a sponsor of the Paydirt Uranium Conference.

References

External links
Official Website
Mullen & Mullen Law Firm
Understanding How Law Firms Bill

Law firms of Australia